Jarhead is a 2005 American biographical war drama film based on U.S. Marine Anthony Swofford's 2003 memoir of the same name. The film was directed by Sam Mendes, starring Jake Gyllenhaal as Swofford with Jamie Foxx, Peter Sarsgaard, Lucas Black, and Chris Cooper. Jarhead chronicles Swofford's life story and his military service in the Persian Gulf War.

The film was released on November 4, 2005, by Universal Pictures. Upon release, the film received mixed reviews and was a box office disappointment, grossing $97 million against a budget of $72 million. Despite the film's mixed response, it spawned a direct-to-video series with three subsequent films.

"Jarhead" is a slang term used to refer to U.S. Marines.

Plot 
In 1989, Anthony "Swoff" Swofford, whose father served in the earlier Vietnam War (1961–1975), attends United States Marine Corps recruit training before being stationed at Camp Pendleton, California. Claiming that he joined the military because he "got lost on the way to college", Swofford finds his time at Camp Pendleton difficult, and struggles to make friends. While Swofford feigns illness to avoid his responsibilities, a "lifer", Staff Sergeant Sykes, takes note of his potential and offers Swofford an opportunity to attend his Scout Sniper course.

After gruelling training, the Scout Sniper course is left with eight candidates, among them Swofford, now a sniper, and Swofford's roommate Corporal Alan Troy who becomes his spotter. When Kuwait is invaded by Iraq, Swofford's unit is deployed to the Arabian Peninsula as a part of "Operation Desert Shield" in the Gulf War (1990–1991). Eager for combat, the Marines find themselves bored with remedial training, constant drills, and a routine monotony that feeds their boredom, and prompts them to talk about the unfaithful girlfriends and wives waiting for them at home. They even erect a bulletin board featuring photographs and brief notes telling what perfidies the women had committed (known in military slang as a "Jodie Wall").

Swofford obtains unauthorized alcohol and organizes an impromptu Christmas party, arranging for Fergus to cover his watch so he can celebrate. Fergus accidentally sets fire to a tent while cooking some sausages and ignites a crate of flares, waking the whole camp and enraging Staff Sergeant Sykes, who demotes Swofford from lance corporal to private and puts him on "shit-burning" detail. The punishments, combined with the heat, the boredom, and Swofford's suspicions of his girlfriend's infidelity, give Swofford a mental breakdown, to the point where he threatens Fergus with a rifle, then orders Fergus to shoot him instead.

Later, Operation Desert Storm begins and the Marines are sent to the Saudi Arabian–Kuwait border. Swofford learns from Sykes that Troy concealed his criminal record when enlisting and will be discharged when the unit returns home. Troy becomes distant from his friends. Knowing that Troy will not be allowed to reenlist, the Marines attack him with a red-hot USMC branding iron, marking him as one of their own. Following an accidental air attack from friendly forces, the Marines advance through the desert, facing no enemies on the ground. The Marines march through the infamous "Highway of Death" (on the northbound road leading back to Iraq from capital Kuwait City), strewn with the burnt vehicles and charred bodies of retreating Iraqi soldiers, the aftermath of a bombing campaign. The Marines later catch sight of distant burning Kuwaiti oil wells, ignited only moments before by retreating Iraqis, and they attempt to dig sleeping holes as a rain of crude oil falls from the sky. Before they can finish, Sykes orders the squad to move upwind.

Near the end of the war, Swofford and Troy are finally given a sniping mission. Lieutenant Colonel Kazinski, their battalion commander, orders them to kill at least one of two high-ranking Iraqi Republican Guard officers at a nearby airfield. At the last second before Swofford takes the shot, Major Lincoln interrupts them to call in an air strike. Troy desperately pleads to make a kill, but is denied and overruled as the airplanes destroy the Iraqi airfield, much to his and Swofford's disappointment. The war ends without Swofford ever firing his rifle. During a monologue, Swofford realizes that all of his training and effort to achieve the elite status as a marine sniper is meaningless in modern warfare.

After returning home the Marines parade through a town in a jovial celebration of victory. Swofford returns home to his family and girlfriend but discovers she has a new boyfriend. Fowler is seen with a prostitute in a bar, now as a Corporal, Kruger in a corporate boardroom, Escobar as a supermarket employee, Cortez as a father of three children, and Sykes continuing his service as a first sergeant in the Iraq War. Later, Swofford learns of Troy's death during a surprise visit from Fergus. He attends his funeral, reunites with some of his old friends and afterwards reminisces about the effects of the war.

Cast

 Jake Gyllenhaal as Lance Corporal / Private / Corporal Anthony Swofford
 Scott MacDonald as Drill Instructor Fitch
 Peter Sarsgaard as Corporal Alan Troy
 Jamie Foxx as Staff Sergeant Sykes
 Lucas Black as Lance Corporal Chris Kruger
 Brian Geraghty as Private First Class Fergus O'Donnell
 Jacob Vargas as Private First Class Juan Cortez
 Laz Alonso as Lance Corporal Ramon Escobar
 Jocko Sims as Julius
 Evan Jones as Private First Class Dave Fowler
 Chris Cooper as Lieutenant Colonel Kazinski
 Dennis Haysbert as Major Lincoln
 John Krasinski as Corporal Harrigan
 Jamie Martz as Foster
 Rini Bell as Swoff's sister
 Brianne Davis as Kristina 

Leonardo DiCaprio and Tobey Maguire were considered for the role of Anthony Swofford.

Critical response
On Rotten Tomatoes, the film has a score of 61% based on 201 reviews, with an average rating of 6.40/10. The site's consensus states: "This first-person account of the first Gulf War scores with its performances and cinematography but lacks an emotional thrust." Roger Ebert gave the movie three-and-a-half out of four stars, crediting it for its unique portrayal of Gulf War Marines who battled boredom and a sense of isolation rather than enemy combatants. Entertainment Weekly magazine gave the film a "B+" rating and Owen Gleiberman wrote:

In his review for the Washington Post, Stephen Hunter praised Jake Gyllenhaal's performance: "What's so good about the movie is Gyllenhaal's refusal to show off; he doesn't seem jealous of the camera's attention when it goes to others and is content, for long stretches, to serve simply as a prism through which other young men can be observed". Sight and Sound magazine's Leslie Felperin wrote, "If nothing else, Jarhead provides some kind of reportage of a war whose consequences we haven't yet begun to understand, a war now elbowed into history by its still-raging sequel". USA Today gave the film three out of four stars and wrote, "What we're left with is solid if not exceptional, though it's good to see Mendes expanding as a filmmaker". TIME magazine's Richard Schickel wrote, "But the best war movies—and this one, despite its being overlong and repetitive, is among them—hold that men fight (or in this case, are ready to fight) not for causes, but to survive and to help their comrades do the same".

However, in his review for The New York Times, A. O. Scott felt that the film was "full of intensity with almost no real visceral impact", and called it "a minor movie about a minor war, and a film that feels, at the moment, remarkably irrelevant". Kenneth Turan in his review for the Los Angeles Times wrote:

In his review for the Village Voice, J. Hoberman wrote, "A master of the monotone, Mendes prompts his performers to hit a note and sustain it. Although Jarhead is more visually accomplished and less empty than American Beauty or Road to Perdition, it still feels oppressively hermetic".

Nathaniel Fick, another author who is a Marine, gave the film a mixed review (and panned the book on which it is based) in Slate. He wrote, "Jarhead also presents wild scenes that probably could happen in combat units, but strips them of the context that might explain how they're more than sheer lunacy". James Meek, who reported from the battlefields of Iraq, wrote in The Guardian:  "The key to a film about war is how it ends, and if the young man at the film's centre is lifted out of the battlefield uninjured and sane, if his family and home life before and after aren't prominent in the picture, the movie is diminished as a film which says something about war and becomes a simpler story of growing up, of jeopardy overcome".

Controversy
In a November 2005 New York Times article, David Carr noted that war veteran and writer Joel Turnipseed felt that parts of the film's plot had been taken from his 2002 book Baghdad Express: A Gulf War Memoir without his consent. Jarhead screenwriter William Broyles Jr. claimed that many similarities arise from the retelling of common Marine experiences.

Accolades

Sequels 
The film was followed by three direct-to-video sequels: Jarhead 2: Field of Fire (2014), Jarhead 3: The Siege (2016) and Jarhead: Law of Return (2019). Unlike the original, all three sequels are entirely fictional and have no connection to the original.

References

External links 

 
 

2005 films
2005 biographical drama films
2000s war drama films
American war drama films
American biographical drama films
Films about snipers
Films based on non-fiction books
Films produced by Douglas Wick
Films produced by Lucy Fisher
Films directed by Sam Mendes
Films scored by Thomas Newman
Films set in 1989
Films set in 1990
Films set in 1991
Films set in Kuwait
Films set in the United States
Films shot in New Mexico
Films shot in California
Films shot in Mexico
Gulf War films
Films about the United States Marine Corps
Universal Pictures films
War films based on actual events
Jarhead (film series)
2005 drama films
Films set in a movie theatre
2000s English-language films
2000s American films